Flower Ezekiel Msuya (born 1959) is a Tanzanian phycologist. She specialises in algaculture (seaweed farming) and integrated aquaculture.

Early life and education
Flower Ezekiel Msuya was born in 1959 in Kifula (Ugweno), a division of Mwanga District in the Kilimanjaro Region of Tanzania. She earned her BSc in botany and statistics from the University of Dar es Salaam. She received an MSc in fisheries and aquaculture from the University of Kuopio in Finland. Based on a course in phycology (the study of algae and seaweed), she developed an interest in seaweed farming. She earned her PhD in seaweed-integrated aquaculture from Tel Aviv University in 2004. Her thesis, "The Influence of Culture Regimes on the Performance of Seaweed Biofilters in Integrated Mariculture", examined the use of seaweed as biofilters for fishpond effluent water.

Career
From 1993 to 1996, Msuya researched the socioeconomic and environmental impacts of seaweed farming. She pioneered the start of seaweed farming in southern Tanzania in 1995 and 1996. From 2005 she has been researching technologies to add value to seaweed (e.g. for making tubular nets).

Since 2017 Msuya has been part of a team implementing the GlobalSeaweedSTAR project to safeguard the future of seaweed aquaculture against the effects of climate change in countries such as Tanzania, Philippines and Malaysia. A project led by the Scottish Association of Marine Science (SAMS) and funded by the UK Research and Innovation Global Challenges Research Fund.

Msuya has worked as a research officer at the Tanzania Fisheries Research Institute (TAFIRI) in Kigoma, Tanzania. She is a former Chief Laboratory Scientist and Senior Researcher in Marine Biology at the Institute of Marine Sciences of the University of Dar es Salaam based in Zanzibar. The need for the Tanzanian industry to develop resilience towards environmental impacts has been a key focus area for her.

Msuya is one of five international trainers in Innovation and Cluster Facilitation. She trains on seaweed farming technologies, value addition and integrating seaweed with other marine products such as sea cucumbers, shellfish and finfish.

Msuya has worked with FAO, WIEGO, UNIDO and WWF. She has contributed to the start of seaweed farming in Mauritius, Rodrigues and Mayotte.

She is a member of the Tropical Agriculture Association (TAA), the Royal Society of Biology (RSB), the World Aquaculture Society (WAS), the International Seaweed Association (ISA), Western Indian Ocean Marine Science Association (WIOMSA) and the Pan African Competitiveness Forum (PACF).

Msuya is the founder and chairperson of the Zanzibar Seaweed Cluster Initiative (ZaSCI). As part of this initiative, she has contributed to producing seaweed products including powder, cosmetics and foods. ZaSCI is also assisting Zanzibar to scale-up seaweed processing through implementing seaweed processing plants for semi-refined carrageenan (the gel that determines the quality of the red seaweeds farmed in the island).

Selected publications

See also
Integrated multi-trophic aquaculture

References

1959 births
Living people
Tanzanian scientists
Academic staff of the University of Dar es Salaam
Tel Aviv University alumni
University of Dar es Salaam alumni
Phycologists
Women phycologists